The Sap is a 1929 American comedy film directed by Archie Mayo and written by De Leon Anthony and Robert Lord. It is based on the 1924 play The Sap by William A. Grew. The film stars Edward Everett Horton, Alan Hale Sr., Patsy Ruth Miller, Russell Simpson, Jerry Mandy and Edna Murphy. The film was released by Warner Bros. on November 9, 1929. It was the last "part-talkie" produced by the studio.

Plot
The sap, unemployed and hapless Bill Small, is not regarded by his wife Betty and her relatives. But he is redeemed by a wise stock investment in wheat which reverses his fortunes in relation to his brother-in-law Ed.

Cast        
Edward Everett Horton as The Sap, Bill Small
Alan Hale Sr. as Jim Belden
Patsy Ruth Miller as Betty, Bill's wife
Russell Simpson as The Banker
Jerry Mandy as The Wop
Edna Murphy as Jane
Louise Carver as Mrs. Sprague
Franklin Pangborn as Ed Mason, Bill's brother-in-law

References

External links
 

1929 films
1920s English-language films
Silent American comedy films
1929 comedy films
Warner Bros. films
Films directed by Archie Mayo
American black-and-white films
1920s American films